Konstantinovka is a rural locality (a village) in Nikolayevsky Selsoviet, Karmaskalinsky District, Bashkortostan, Russia. The population was 1,691 as of 2010. There are 21 streets.

Geography 
Konstantinovka is located 7 km north of Karmaskaly (the district's administrative centre) by road. Ulyanovka is the nearest rural locality.

References 

Rural localities in Karmaskalinsky District